NSW Pride is an Australian field hockey club based in Sydney. The club was established in 2019, and is one of 7 established to compete in Hockey Australia's new premier domestic competition, Hockey One.

The club unifies both men and women under one name, unlike New South Wales' former representation in the Australian Hockey League as the NSW Waratahs (men) and NSW Arrows (women).

NSW Pride competed for the first time in the inaugural season of Hockey One, which was contested from late September through to mid November 2019.

The NSW Pride Men's came first, becoming the inaugural Hockey One Men's Champions and defeating the Brisbane Blaze 8–3 in the Grand Final, with Flynn Ogilvie being named Player of the Final and Blake Govers as the tournaments Top Goalscorer.

History
NSW Pride, along with six other teams, was founded on 17 April 2019 as part of Hockey Australia's development of hockey.

The team's logo and colours are inspired by the New South Wales flag. The name 'Pride' is intended to evoke feelings of "community, strength and fierceness."

NSW Pride is strangely focused on its foundation as a team for the community, with many of its famous identifiers being selected by the fanbase. In May 2019, NSW Pride ran a four-week knockout style contest to select the new team's motto. Asking fans to vote via social media, the options dwindled down to two final options: 'Defend The Den' vs. 'Unleash The Beast'. The end result was a landslide with 'Unleash The Beast' winning and henceforth adopted as the team's motto.

Following the success of the Tagline Tournament, NSW Pride deployed the same tactic again in August 2019 with their Name Our Lion campaign; a chance for fans to name the new team's mascot. The contest was once again, conducted via social media with one fan winning a family membership by voting in the contest. With over 1,000 votes submitted over the four week campaign, the pride fanbase (commonly nicknamed Pride Nation) overwhelming selected 'Roary' as the team's new mascot name.

Home Stadium
NSW Pride are based out of Sydney Olympic Park in New South Wales' capital city, Sydney. The stadium has a capacity of 8,000 spectators, with 4,000 fixed seats. Following the announcement of new team name, NSW Pride, the stadium has adopted the nickname The Lions Den.

Uniforms 
The uniform of the NSW Pride Men and Women's teams corresponds with the team's colours of gold and red. Incorporating the team's signature lion on the front and teeth marks on the socks.

The introduction of the Hockey One made history with both men and women wearing the same uniform and united under the same name for the first time in Australia's domestic hockey history.

Performance

Teams

Men's team
The following players were names in the men's preliminary squad.

 Liam Alexander
 Brady Anderson
 Timothy Brand
 Tom Brown
 Berkeley-John Bruton
 Lain Carr
 Tom Craig
 Ben Craig
 Matthew Dawson
 Hayden Dillon
 Isaac Farmilo
 Matthew Fleming
 Blake Govers
 Kieran Govers
 Sam Gray
 Jack Hayes
 Ehren Hazell
 Nick Holman
 Matthew Johnson
 Sam Liles
 Kurt Lovett
 Alex Mackay
 Callum Mackay
 Dylan Martin
 Thomas Miotto
 Flynn Ogilvie
 Ryan Proctor
 Daine Richards
 Lachlan Sharp
 Nathanael Stewart
 Ash Thomas
 Rory Walker
 Tristan White
 Matthew Willis
 Ky Willott

Women's team
The following players were names in the women's preliminary squad.

 Alice Arnott
 Jocelyn Bartram
 Morgan Blamey
 Tamsin Bunt
 Emily Chalker
 Naomi Duncan
 Andrea Gillard
 Kate Hanna
 Greta Hayes
 Jaime Hemmingway
 Rene Hunter
 Grace Jeffrey
 Kate Jenner
 Sarah Johnston
 Hannah Kable
 Georgina Morgan
 Kaitlin Nobbs
 Jess Parr
 Mikaela Patterson
 Lexie Pickering
 Renae Robinson
 Casey Sablowski
 Courtney Schonell
 Emma Scriven
 Molly Simpson
 Maddison Smith
 Emma Spinks
 Grace Stewart
 Helena Tobbe
 Jessica Watterson
 Mariah Williams
 Abigail Wilson
 Grace Young

References

Australian field hockey clubs
Women's field hockey teams in Australia
Sporting clubs in Adelaide
Field hockey clubs established in 2019
2019 establishments in Australia
Hockey One
Field hockey in New South Wales